A switching and terminal railroad is a freight railroad company whose primary purpose is to perform local switching services or to own and operate a terminal facility. Switching is a type of operation done within the limits of a yard. It generally consists of making up and breaking up trains, storing and classifying cars, serving industries within yard limits, and other related purposes. These movements are made at slow speed under special yard rules.

A terminal facility can include a union freight station, train ferry, car float or bridge. Its purpose is to connect larger carriers to other modes of transport or other carriers.

These companies may be jointly owned by several major carriers; examples include the Kansas City Terminal Railway, Belt Railway of Chicago, Terminal Railroad Association of St. Louis, Galveston Railroad and Conrail Shared Assets Operations.

The Internal Revenue Service provides tax incentives for this type of company. They may also be created when a larger railroad abandons an unprofitable line, and a short-line railroad takes over operations to connect shippers to the larger company.

References